Pieces of Woo: The Other Side is an album by the former Parliament-Funkadelic keyboardist Bernie Worrell. It was released by CMP Records in 1993. None of the tracks contain drums or percussion. Pieces of Woo features Fred Wesley, Buckethead, and Umar Bin Hassan.

Critical reception
The New Straits Times praised "the funk-flavoured 'The Mask' and the noise exercise 'Gladiator Skull'," deeming them "full of forceful organ ripples that create an awe-inspiring wall of sound."

AllMusic called the album "a jaw-dropping, delightful adventure of unexplored and unexpected sonic realms."

Track listing

"Witness For The Defense" (Fred Wesley, Worrell)  5:17
"Set The Tone/Victory" (Amina Claudine Myers, Umar Bin Hassan, Worrell)  9:48
"The Mask" (Buckethead, Worrell)  7:43
"Gladiator Skull" (Bill Laswell, Worrell)  4:13
"Moon Over Brixton" (Alfred Ellis, Wesley)  6:02
"Judie's Passion Purple" (Bill Laswell, Worrell)  14:43
"Fields of Play" (Oz Fritz, Bill Laswell, Worrell) 2:45

Personnel

Witness For the Defense
Organ, Synthesizer: Bernie Worrell
Trombone: Fred Wesley
French Horn: Vincent Chancey
Bass Clarinet: Marty Ehrlich
Bassoon: Janet Grice
Clarinet: Patience Higgins
Woodwind Arranger: Bernie Worrell

Set The Tone/Victory
Mini Moog, Clavinet: Bernie Worrell
Organ: Bernie Worrell, Amina Claudine Myers
Vocal Narration: Umar Bin Hassan

The Mask
Organ: Bernie Worrell
Guitar, Effects: Buckethead

Gladiator Skull
Organ, Synthesizer: Bernie Worrell
Beats, Loops, Samples: Bill Laswell

Moon Over Brixton
Organ: Bernie Worrell
Trombone: Fred Wesley
French Horn: Vincent Chancey
Bass Clarinet: Marty Ehrlich
Bassoon: Janet Grice
Clarinet: Patience Higgins
Noise: Bill Laswell
Woodwind Arranger: Bernie Worrell

Judie's Passion Purple
Electric Piano, Organ: Bernie Worrell
Organ: Amina Claudine Myers
Noise: Bill Laswell

Fields of Play
Synthesizer: Bernie Worrell
Samples, Effects: Bill Laswell
Sounds: Oz Fritz

References

Bernie Worrell albums
1993 albums
Albums produced by Bill Laswell